16S rRNA may refer to:

 16S ribosomal RNA, the prokaryotic ribosomal subunit
 Mitochondrially encoded 16S RNA, the eukaryotic ribosomal subunit